Rafflesia is a Belgian metalcore band from Zeebrugge, Belgium, formed in 2005 as part of the H8000 scene. Their style has also been described as death metal and hardcore punk.

History
In 2005, Bart Teetaert, Lazer Zec, Maxime Aneca, Nick Dapper and Jeremy de Schrijver formed the band. A few months later they performed at their first concert and quickly racked up a number of fans. Genet Records noticed this and signed them a record deal.

In May 2006, Rafflesia released their self-titled mini-cd containing five songs. Short after the mini-cd got released, Maxime Aneca got replaced by Christian Charles Borny (a.k.a. CCB). This change in the line-up caused more melody in their songs. In February 2007 Rafflesia travelled to Germany to record their first full cd named The Rape of Harmonies Studio with Ralf Müller and Alexander Dietz; respectively producer and guitar player from Heaven Shall Burn.

In May 2007 they released their album named Embrace the final day. The band subsequently played with such bands as Heaven Shall Burn, Maroon, Caliban, Sepultura, Aborted, Cro-Mags, Bleeding Through and Parkway Drive. During their tour the bassist Jeremy de Schrijver split from the band. He got temporarily replaced by Koen de Croo from Suburbia in Ruins, but he was soon replaced permanently by Nick Vyvey, who featured before in Omerta.

In June 2010, Rafflesia released their newest album titled In the Face of Suffering.

Discography

Rafflesia (2006)
 Driven By Fire
 Suffocation Of The World
 Abstract Divinity
 13 Hours
 Last Words

Embrace the Final Day (2007)
 Annihilation
 A Time Of Deceit
 Perfidy
 The Beauty Of Silence
 Preludium
 Into Bloodshed
 This Beast We Created
 Box Nr. 8
 Sinner's Cross
 These Two Rivals

In the Face of Suffering (2010)
 The Dead Tell No Tale
 Bow Down
 Autopsy Of A Blackened Soul
 Axiom
 Earth Stands Still
 The Tide Of Death
 New Dawn Rising
 Misery And Pain
 Divine Retribution
 Unvanquished

External links
Rafflesia Website
Instagram
Genet Records

Metalcore musical groups
Belgian heavy metal musical groups